Sihvo is a Finnish surname.

Geographical distribution
As of 2014, 92.8% of all known bearers of the surname Sihvo were residents of Finland (frequency 1:7,886), 4.7% of Sweden (1:281,336) and 1.5% of Canada (1:3,345,273).

In Finland, the frequency of the surname was higher than national average (1:7,886) in the following regions:
 1. South Karelia (1:2,003)
 2. Kymenlaakso (1:3,351)
 3. Päijänne Tavastia (1:3,749)
 4. Tavastia Proper (1:3,980)
 5. Pirkanmaa (1:5,318)
 6. Southern Savonia (1:7,153)
 7. Uusimaa (1:7,768)
 8. Lapland (1:7,876)

People
 Aarne Sihvo (1889–1963), Finnish general and Member of Parliament

References

Finnish-language surnames
Surnames of Finnish origin